Fatreh (also spelled Fatry) is a municipality in the Byblos District of  Keserwan-Jbeil Governorate, Lebanon. It is 45 kilometers north of Beirut. Fatreh has an average elevation of 500 meters above sea level and a total land area of 294 hectares. Its inhabitants are predominantly Maronite Catholics.

References

Populated places in Byblos District
Maronite Christian communities in Lebanon